Phostria mediospilota is a moth in the family Crambidae. It was described by Jean Ghesquière in 1942. It is found in the former province of Équateur in the Democratic Republic of the Congo.

References

Phostria
Moths described in 1942
Moths of Africa